Damblainville is a commune in the Calvados department and Normandy region of north-western France.

Its inhabitants are known as Damblainvillais.

Population

See also
Communes of the Calvados department

References

Calvados communes articles needing translation from French Wikipedia
Communes of Calvados (department)